Tom Kingston (born 19 June 1991) is an Australian professional rugby footballer. His usual position is outside centre or wing. He signed on to play for the Melbourne Rebels in 2014.

Early life 
Kingston first started playing Rugby in Hong Kong and when his family returned to Australia he played junior rugby for the Mosman Whales before moving to play for the Manly Roos. He showed promise in his junior rugby career while at St Aloysius' College. His performances earned him selection in the Australian U16 Merit Side in 2007. Despite impressing selectors as a 17-year-old, Kingston missed out on playing for the Australian Schoolboys side in 2008, following a collarbone injury. He was selected in 2009 and earned four caps for his country.

Rugby career 
In 2011 he made his debut for the New South Wales Waratahs, and later that year was selected in the Australian Under 20s side to play in the 2011 IRB Junior World Championship in Italy.
He was also selected for the Australian Sevens side in 2011, but had to forgo the opportunity to tour due to his commitments with the Waratahs.

Kingston became a regular for the Waratahs in 2012. On the back of strong performances, he was named in the media as a potential candidate for the Wallabies but did not gain selection. In late May 2013, he signed a two-year deal to join the Melbourne Rebels, starting in the 2014 Super Rugby season.

He competed at the 2016 Summer Olympics.

Super Rugby statistics

Honours 
Individual
2011 Young Waratah of the Year

Smartest man in rugby 

There was speculation Kingston might be the "smartest man in rugby" after he scored 104 out of 100 in his 2009 ATAR ranking – receiving a ranking of 99 based on his HSC marks, with five bonus additional points awarded due to his national representative achievements in rugby.

References

External links
 Melbourne Rebels profile
 
 
 
 
 
 

1991 births
Australian rugby union players
Rugby union wings
Living people
People educated at St Aloysius' College (Sydney)
New South Wales Waratahs players
Melbourne Rebels players
Rugby union players from Sydney
Sydney Stars players
Rugby sevens players at the 2016 Summer Olympics
Olympic rugby sevens players of Australia
Australia international rugby sevens players